"Come" is a song by French singer-songwriter  Jain from her debut studio album Zanaka and was also featured in NBA 2K17. It was written by Jain along with Kenan Williams with producer Maxim Nucci and released on 11 May 2015.

Live performances
Jain performed "Come" on the season final of the talent show The Voice of Italy on 23 May 2016.

Charts

Weekly charts

Year-end charts

Certifications

References

2016 singles
2016 songs
SNEP Top Singles number-one singles